Corybas pruinosus, commonly known as the toothed helmet orchid, is a species of terrestrial orchid endemic to New South Wales. It grows in moist forests and has a single round or heart-shaped leaf and a relatively small, translucent grey flower with dark red markings.

Description
The leaf is green on the upper surface and silvery green on the lower side. There is a single translucent grey flower with dark red markings. Flowering occurs from April to July.

Taxonomy
The toothed helmet orchid was first formally described in 1871 by Richard Cunningham and given the name Corysanthes pruinosa. The description was published in the New South Wales Magazine. In 1871, Heinrich Gustav Reichenbach changed the name to Corybas pruinosus. The specific epithet (pruinosus) is a Latin word meaning "frosty" or "rimy".

Distribution and habitat
The toothed helmet orchid grows in forest with shrubs between Nelson Bay, Moruya and Paterson.

References

pruinosus
Endemic orchids of Australia
Orchids of New South Wales
Plants described in 1871